An Integration Reference Point is a 3GPP standard and a concept for defining management interfaces. The purpose is to promote wider adoption of standardized management interfaces in telecommunications networks. The IRP concept provides for protocol and technology neutral modelling as well as protocol specific solution sets.

The three cornerstones of the IRP concept are: 
 Top-down, process-driven modelling approach 
 Technology-independent modelling 
 Standards-based technology-dependent modelling 
When an IRP is technology-dependent it uses a solution set which can be, for example, SOAP, or CORBA.

There are three categories of IRP specifications:
 Interface IRPs that relate to a set of operations and notifications for a specific telecom management domain such as alarm management, configuration management, etc.
 Network resource model (NRM) IRPs that relate to a particular Network resource model, and do not define any operations or notifications
 Data Definition IRPs that relate to commonly used data definitions that can be imported for use in other IRPs

References 

3GPP standards